Gurubai Karmarkar (died 1932) was the second Indian woman to graduate from the Women's Medical College of Pennsylvania in 1886.

Medical career

Gurubai Karmarkar returned to India in 1893 after receiving her medical degree. She worked for the 23 years at the American Marathi Mission, a Christian establishment, in Bombay, India. Her medical work focused mainly on the most disenfranchised members of the Indian caste system. A prominent group in her practice were women of all castes. In one letter to the Woman's board of missions, Dr. Karmarkar tells the stories of two "young child-wives" she treated over the past year. Both young woman suffered abuse from their husbands and in-laws. The first young wife had been branded on her foot to stop her from running away. The second wife was malnourished and was suffering from a severe fever. Dr. Karmarkar uses these two stories as a way to illustrate the plight of Indian women to her counterparts in the United States.

Karmarkar was a member of the National Board of the YWCA in India.

References

External links

Gurubai Karmarkar materials in the South Asian American Digital Archive
Gurubai Karmarkar materials in the Drexel University Archives and Special Collections 
Women works of the Orient in the Internet Archive

19th-century Indian medical doctors
Indian women medical doctors
20th-century Indian women scientists
Drexel University alumni
Medical doctors from Mumbai
19th-century births
1932 deaths
20th-century Indian medical doctors
Women scientists from Maharashtra
20th-century women physicians
19th-century women physicians